A children's railway or pioneer railway is an extracurricular educational institution, where children interested in rail transport can learn railway professions. This phenomenon originated in the USSR and was greatly developed in Soviet times. The world's first children's railway was opened in Gorky Park, Moscow, in 1932. At the breakup of the USSR, 52 children's railways existed in the country.

Many children's railways are still functioning in post-Soviet states and Eastern European countries. Many exhibit railway technology not seen anymore on the main lines and can be seen as heritage railways. Even though few exceptions exist, most children's railways built in the Eastern Bloc have a track gauge of at least  and can carry full size narrow gauge rolling stock.

List of children's railways

Armenia
Yerevan Children's railway

Azerbaijan 
 Baku Children's Railway

Belarus
Children's Railroad (Minsk)

Bulgaria
Plovdiv
Kardzhali

China
Harbin

Cuba
Camagüey, Parque Camilo Cienfuegos
Havana, Parque Lenin (not operating)
Havana, Havana Zoo

Georgia
Tbilisi
Rustavi (not operating)

Germany
Berliner Parkeisenbahn, Berlin, Wuhlheide
Parkeisenbahn Krumbholz, Bernburg, Krumbholzallee
Parkeisenbahn Chemnitz, Chemnitz, Küchwald
Parkeisenbahn Cottbus, Cottbus, Eliaspark - Spreeauenpark
Ferienlandeisenbahn Crispendorf, Crispendorf, Ferienland
Dresdner Parkeisenbahn, Dresden, Großer Garten
Parkeisenbahn Gera, Gera, Tierpark
Görlitzer Parkeisenbahn, Görlitz, An der Landskronbrauerei
Parkeisenbahn Peißnitzexpress Halle, Halle, Saxony-Anhalt, Peißnitzinsel
Leipziger Parkeisenbahn, Leipzig-Wahren, Auensee
Pioniereisenbahn Magdeburg, Magdeburg, Rotehornpark, until 1967
Parkeisenbahn Plauen, Plauen, Syratal
Parkeisenbahn Vatterode, Vatterode, Vatteröder Teich

Hungary
Children's Railway (Budapest)
Pécs
Nagycenk
Tiszakécske

Kazakhstan

Aktobe (now defunct)
Alma-Ata Children's Railway, Almaty
Arkalyk (now defunct)
Atbasar (now defunct)
Ekibastuz (now defunct)
Karaganda Children's Railway, Karaganda
Kokshetau Children's Railway, Kokshetau (now defunct)
Kostanay (now defunct)
Astana (now defunct)
Pavlodar (now defunct)
Semey (now defunct)
Schuchinsk (now defunct)
Shymkent Children's Railway, Shymkent
Zhezkazgan (now defunct)

Poland
Chorzów, Silesian Culture and Recreation Park
Poznań, Park Railway Maltanka (now run by the city)

Russia

Chelyabinsk
Chita
Ekaterinburg
Irkutsk
Kazan
Kemerovo
Far East Children's Railway, Khabarovsk
Krasnoyarsk
Kratovo
Kurgan
Liski
Nizhny Novgorod
Novomoskovsk
Small West Siberian Railway, Novosibirsk
Orenburg
Penza
Rostov-Na-Donu
Sankt-Petersburg, Malaya Oktyabrskaya railway
Svobodny
Tyumen
Ufa
Vladikavkaz
Volgograd
Children's Railway Sakhalin, Yuzhno-Sakhalinsk
Yaroslavl

Slovakia
Košice Children's Heritage Railway, Košice

Turkmenistan
Ashgabat

Ukraine

Dnipro
Donetsk
Kharkiv
Kyiv
Lutsk
Lviv
Rivne
Uzhorod
Zaporizhzhia

United Kingdom 
Downs Light Railway

Uzbekistan
Jizzakh
Tashkent

See also
Backyard railroad
Garden railway
  Minimum-gauge railway
Ridable miniature railway
Train ride

References

External links

Children's railways of the USSR 
railways.id.ru 
 
 

750 mm gauge railways
Rail transport in the Soviet Union
Russian inventions
Soviet inventions

hu:Gyermekvasút